This is a list of schools in Cumbria, England.

State-funded schools

Primary schools

All Saints' CE School, Cockermouth
Allithwaite CE Primary School, Allithwaite
Allonby Primary School, Allonby
Alston Primary School, Alston
Ambleside CE Primary School, Ambleside
Appleby Primary School, Appleby-in-Westmorland
Arlecdon Primary School, Arlecdon
Armathwaite School, Armathwaite
Arnside National CE School, Arnside
Asby Endowed School, Great Asby
Ashfield Infant & Nursery School, Workington
Ashfield Junior School, Workington
Askam Village School, Askam-in-Furness
Barrow Island Community Primary School, Barrow-in-Furness
Bassenthwaite Primary School, Bassenthwaite
Beaconside CE Primary School, Penrith
Beckermet CE School, Beckermet
Beckstone Primary School, Harrington
Beetham CE Primary School, Beetham
Belle Vue Primary School, Carlisle
Bewcastle School, Bewcastle
The Bishop Harvey Goodwin CE School, Currock
Black Combe Junior School, Millom
Blackford CE Primary School, Blackford
Blennerhasset School, Blennerhasset
Bolton Primary School, Bolton
Boltons CE School, Bolton Low Houses
Bookwell Primary School, Egremont
Borrowdale CE Primary School, Borrowdale
Bowness-on-Solway Primary School, Bowness-on-Solway
Braithwaite CE Primary School, Braithwaite
Brampton Primary School, Brampton
Bransty Primary School, Bransty
Bridekirk Dovenby CE Primary School, Dovenby
Brisbane Park Infant School, Barrow-in-Furness
Brook Street Primary School, Carlisle
Brough Community Primary School, Church Brough
Broughton CE Primary and Nursery School, Broughton-in-Furness
Broughton Moor Primary School, Broughton Moor
Broughton Primary School, Great Broughton
Brunswick School, Penrith
Burgh by Sands School, Burgh by Sands
Burlington CE School, Kirkby-in-Furness
Burton Morewood CE Primary School, Burton-in-Kendal
Caldew Lea School, Carlisle
Calthwaite CE School, Calthwaite
Cambridge Primary School, Barrow-in-Furness
Captain Shaw's CE School, Bootle
Cartmel CE Primary School, Cartmel
Castle Carrock School, Castle Carrock
Castle Park School, Kendal
Chapel Street Infants and Nursery School, Dalton-in-Furness
Chetwynde School, Barrow-in-Furness
Church Walk CofE Primary School, Ulverston
Clifton Primary School, Clifton
Coniston CE Primary School, Coniston
Croftlands Infant School, Ulverston
Croftlands Junior School, Ulverston
Crosby Ravensworth CE School, Crosby Ravensworth
Crosby-on-Eden CE School, Crosby-on-Eden
Crosscanonby St John's CE School, Crosscanonby
Crosscrake CofE Primary School, Stainton
Crosthwaite CE School, Crosthwaite
Culgaith CE School, Culgaith
Cummersdale School, Cummersdale
Cumwhinton School, Cumwhinton
Dalton St Mary's CE Primary School, Dalton-in-Furness
Dane Ghyll Community Primary School and Nursey, Barrow-in-Furness
Dean Barwick Primary School, Witherslack
Dean CE School, Dean
Dean Gibson RC Primary School, Kendal
Dearham Primary School, Dearham
Dent CE Primary School, Dent
Derwent Vale Primary and Nursery School, Great Clifton
Distington Community School, Distington
Eaglesfield Paddle CE Primary Academy, Eaglesfield
Ellenborough Academy, Ellenborough
Ennerdale and Kinniside CE Primary School, Ennerdale Bridge
Ewanrigg Junior School, Ewanrigg
Fairfield Primary School, Cockermouth
Fellview Primary School, Caldbeck
Fir Ends Primary School, Smithfield
Flimby Primary School, Flimby
Flookburgh CE Primary School, Flookburgh
Frizington Community Primary School, Frizington
George Romney Primary School, Dalton-in-Furness
Ghyllside Primary School, Kendal
Gilsland CE Primary School, Gilsland
Goodly Dale Primary School, Windermere
Gosforth CE Primary School, Gosforth
Grange CE Primary School, Grange-over-Sands
Grasmere CE Primary School, Grasmere
Grasslot Infant School, Maryport
Grayrigg CE School, Grayrigg
Great Corby Primary School, Great Corby
Great Orton Primary School, Great Orton
Greengate Junior School, Barrow-in-Furness
Greystoke Primary School, Greystoke
Hallbankgate Village School, Hallbankgate
Haverigg Primary School, Haverigg
Hawkshead Esthwaite Primary School, Hawkshead
Hayton CE Primary School, Hayton
Hensingham Primary School, Hensingham
Heron Hill Primary School,  Kendal
High Hesket CE School, High Hesket
Holm Cultram Abbey CE School, Abbeytown
Holme Primary School, Holme
Holme St Cuthbert School, Holme St Cuthbert
Holy Family RC Primary School, Newbarns
Houghton CE School, Houghton
Inglewood Infant School, Carlisle
Inglewood Junior School, Carlisle
Ireby CE School, Ireby
Ireleth St Peter's CE Primary School, Ireleth
Irthington Village School, Irthington
Ivegill CE School, Ivegill
Jerchio Primary School, Whitehaven
Kells Infant School, Kells
Kingmoor Junior School, Carlisle
Kingmoor Nursery and Infant School, Carlisle
Kirkbampton CE School, Kirkbampton
Kirkbride Primary School, Kirkbride
Kirkby Stephen Primary School, Kirkby Stephen
Kirkby Thore School, Kirkby Thore
Kirkland CE Academy, Kirkland
Kirkoswald CE School, Kirkoswald
Lanercost CE Primary School, Lanercost
Langdale CE School, Chapel Stile
Langwathby CE Primary School, Langwathby
Lazonby CE Primary School, Lazonby
Leven Valley CE Primary School, Backbarrow
Levens CE School, Levens
Lindal and Marton Primary School, Lindal-in-Furness
Lindale CE Primary School, Lindale
Long Marton School, Long Marton
Longtown Primary School, Longtown
Lorton School, High Lorton
Low Furness CE Primary School, Great Urswick
Lowca Community School, Lowca
Lowther Endowed School, Hackthorpe
Milburn School, Milburn
Millom Infant School, Millom
Milnthorpe Primary School, Milnthorpe
Monkwray Junior School, Whithaven
Montreal CE Primary School, Cleator Moor
Moor Row Community Primary School, Moor Row
Moresby Primary School, Moresby
Morland Area CE Primary School, Morland
Nenthead Primary School, Nenthead
Netherton Infant School, Maryport
Newbarns Primary & Nursery School, Barrow-in-Furness
Newlaithes Infant School, Carlisle
Newlaithes Junior School, Carlisle
Newton Primary School, Newton-in-Furness
Newtown Primary School, Carlisle
Norman Street Primary School, Carlisle
North Lakes School, Penrith
North Walney Primary & Nursery School, Walney
Northside Primary School, Workington
Old Hutton CE School, Old Hutton
Orgill Primary School, Orgill
Ormsgill Nursery and Primary School, Barrow-in-Furness
Orton CE School, Orton
Oughterside Primary School, Oughterside
Our Lady and St Patrick's RC Primary School, Maryport
Our Lady of the Rosary RC Primary School, Dalton-in-Furness
Parkside Academy, Barrow-in-Furness
Patterdale CE School, Patterdale
Pennine Way Primary School, Carlisle
Pennington CE School, Pennington
Penny Bridge CofE School, Greenodd
Penruddock Primary School, Penruddock
Petteril Bank School, Carlisle
Plumbland CE School, Parsonby
Plumpton School, Plumpton
Ramsden Infant School, Barrow-in-Furness
Raughton Head CE School & Nursery, Raughton Head
Richmond Hill School, Aspatria
Robert Ferguson Primary School, Denton Holme
Rockcliffe CE School, Rockcliffe
Roose School, Barrow-in-Furness
Rosley CE School, Rosley
Sacred Heart RC Primary School, Barrow-in-Furness
St Bede's RC Primary School, Carlisle
St Bees Village Primary School, St Bees
St Bega's CE Primary School, Eskdale Green
St Begh's RC Junior School, Whitehaven
St Bridget's CE School, Brigham
St Bridget's CE School, Parton
St Bridget's RC Primary School, Egremont
St Catherine's RC Primary School, Penrith
St Columba's School, Walney
St Cuthbert's RC Primary School, Botcherby
St Cuthbert's RC Primary School, Wigton
St Cuthbert's RC Primary School, Windermere
St George's CE School, Barrow-in-Furness
St Gregory and St Patrick's RC Infant School, Corkickle
St Gregory's RC Primary School, Westfield
St Herbert's CE Primary and Nursery School, Keswick
St James' CE Infant and Nursery School, Whitehaven
St James' CE Junior School, Barrow-in-Furness
St James' CE Junior School, Whitehaven
St James' Catholic Primary School, Millom
St Joseph's RC Primary School, Frizington
St Margaret Mary RC Primary School, Carlisle
St Mark's CE Primary School, Natland
St Martin & St Mary CE Primary School, Windermere
St Mary's CE Primary School, Kirkby Lonsdale
St Mary's RC Primary School, Kells
St Mary's RC Primary School, Salterbeck
St Mary's RC Primary School, Ulverston
St Matthew's CE School, Westnewton
St Michael's CE Primary School, Bothel
St Michael's CE Primary School, Dalston
St Michael's Nursery and Infant School, Workington
St Oswald's CE Primary School, Burneside
St Patrick's CE School, Endmoor
St Patrick's RC Primary School, Cleator Moor
St Patrick's RC Primary School, Workington
St Paul's CE Junior School, Barrow-in-Furness
St Pius X RC Primary School, Barrow-in-Furness
St Thomas's CE Primary School, Kendal
Scotby CE Primary School, Scotby
Seascale Primary School, Seascale
Seaton Academy, Seaton
Seaton St Paul's CE Junior School, Seaton
Sedbergh Primary School, Sedbergh
Selside Endowed CE Primary School, Selside
Shankhill CE Primary School, Hethersgill
Shap Endowed CE Primary School, Shap
Silloth Primary School, Silloth
Sir John Barrow School, Ulverston
Skelton School, Skelton
South Walney Infant and Nursery School, Walney
South Walney Junior School, Walney
Stainton CE Primary School, Stainton
Stanwix School, Stanwix
Staveley CE Primary School, Staveley
Stoneraise School, Durdar
Storth CE School, Storth
Stramongate Primary School, Kendal
Tebay Primary School, Tebay
Temple Sowerby CE Primary School, Temple Sowerby
Thomlinson Junior School, Wigton
Thornhill Primary School, Thornhill
Threlkeld CE Primary School, Threlkeld
Thursby Primary School, Thursby
Thwaites School, Hallthwaites
Upperby Primary School, Upperby
Valley Primary School and Nursery, Whitehaven
Vicarage Park CE Primary School, Kendal
Vickerstown School, Walney
Victoria Academy, Barrow-in-Furness
Victoria Infant and Nursery School, Barrow-in-Furness
Victoria Infant and Nursery School, Workington
Victoria Junior School, Workington
Waberthwaite CE School, Waberthwaite
Walton & Lees Hill CE School, Brampton
Warcop CE Primary School, Warcop
Warwick Bridge Primary School, Warwick Bridge
Westfield Nursery and Primary School, Westfield
Wiggonby CE School, Wiggonby
Wigton Infant School, Wigton
Wreay CE Primary School, Wreay
Yanwath Primary School, Yanwath
Yarlside Academy, Barrow-in-Furness
Yewdale School, Carlisle

Secondary schools 

Appleby Grammar School, Appleby-in-Westmorland
Beacon Hill Community School, Aspatria
Caldew School, Dalston
Cartmel Priory School, Cartmel
Chetwynde School, Barrow-in-Furness
Cockermouth School, Cockermouth
Dallam School, Milnthorpe
Dowdales School, Dalton-in-Furness
Energy Coast UTC, Workington
Furness Academy, Barrow-in-Furness
John Ruskin School, Coniston
Keswick School, Keswick
Kirkbie Kendal School, Kendal
Kirkby Stephen Grammar School, Kirkby Stephen
The Lakes School, Troutbeck Bridge
Millom School, Millom
The Nelson Thomlinson School, Wigton
Netherhall School, Maryport
Queen Elizabeth Grammar School, Penrith
Queen Elizabeth School, Kirkby Lonsdale
Queen Elizabeth Studio School, Kirkby Lonsdale
Queen Katherine School, Kendal
Richard Rose Central Academy, Carlisle
Richard Rose Morton Academy, Carlisle
St Benedict's Catholic High School, Hensingham
St Bernard's Catholic High School, Barrow-in-Furness
St John Henry Newman Catholic School, Carlisle
St Joseph's Catholic High School, Workington
Samuel King's School, Alston
Settlebeck School, Sedbergh
Solway Community School, Silloth
Trinity School, Carlisle
Ullswater Community College, Penrith
Ulverston Victoria High School, Ulverston
Walney School, Walney
West Lakes Academy, Egremont
The Whitehaven Academy, Whitehaven
William Howard School, Brampton
Workington Academy, Workington

Special and alternative schools

Cumbria Academy for Autism, Workington
George Hastwell School, Walney
Gillford Centre, Carlisle
James Rennie School, Carlisle
Mayfield School, Whitehaven
Newbridge House PRU, Barrow-in-Furness
Sandgate School, Kendal
Sandside Lodge School, Ulverston
West Cumbria Learning Centre, Distington

Further education 
Barrow-in-Furness Sixth Form College, Barrow-in-Furness
Carlisle College, Carlisle
Furness College, Barrow-in-Furness
Kendal College, Kendal
Lakes College West Cumbria, Workington

Independent schools

Primary and preparatory schools
Hunter Hall School, Penrith
Sedbergh Preparatory School, Casterton

Senior and all-through schools
Austin Friars, Carlisle
Lime House School, Dalston
St Bees School, St Bees
Sedbergh School, Sedbergh
Windermere School, Windermere

Special and alternative schools

Appletree School, Natland
Cairn Education, Staveley
Cambian Whinfell School, Kendal
Fell House School, Grange-over-Sands
Kirby Moor School, Brampton
Moorfield Learning Centre, Barrow-in-Furness
Oversands School, Witherslack
Progress Schools, Carlisle
South Lakes Academy, Kendal
SwitchED2, Meathop
Underley Garden School, Kirkby Lonsdale
Wings School, Whassett

References

Cumbria

Lists of buildings and structures in Cumbria